Signe Ramberg (November 4, 1900 – January 15, 1987) was a Norwegian actress.

Life
Signe Ramberg was born in Eidanger, Norway. She performed as a stage actress at the New Theater from 1929 to 1944, and she also appeared in five film roles between 1930 and 1944. Ramberg died in 1987 and is buried in the Old Eidanger Cemetery in Eidanger.

Filmography
1930: Kristine Valdresdatter as Kari Fjelstugu
1931: Den store barnedåpen as Toralfa
1937: To levende og en død as a guest at the hostel
1938: Ungen as Olina
1944: Brudekronen as Tallak's mother

References

External links
 
 Signe Ramberg at Sceneweb
 Signe Ramberg at Filmfront

1900 births
1987 deaths
20th-century Norwegian actresses